Antelope was a packet ship built for the British East India Company (EIC) in 1781. She made one voyage for the company that ended when she was wrecked on 10 August 1783 off Ulong, near Koror Island in Palau. This resulted in the first sustained European contact with those islands.

Captain Henry Wilson left the Downs on 6 February 1781 to carry despatches to China via the Pacific route. However, Antelope did not leave Falmouth until 2 September. On 16 December she was off Cape San Diego, Argentina, and then on 2 January 1782 she was off Cape Horn. She reached the Sulu Sea on 23 April, Cageyan Sulu on 30 April, Balambangan on 14 May, and arrived at Macao on 4 June. On 16 September 1782 Antelope left Calcutta.

She left Macao on 20 July 1783 and wrecked on 10 August on the reef near the Pelew Islands. They then spent some time on Oroolong Island (today Ulong Island) before natives from other Palau islands found them (Oroolong being little used). 

Antelopes reckoning appears to have been off by some 26 miles.

With the assistance of the natives, Wilson and his crew used boards from Antelope, and new materials, to built a boat, which they called the Oroolong. Wilson brought with him Prince Lee Boo, and left behind Madan Blanchard, a seaman who chose not to leave. Blanchard died in an engagement with locals sometime before 1790. 

They left the island on 12 November and arrived on 30 November back at Macao. Captain Wilson sailed from Macao to Canton, where he sold his ship for $700. He returned to England with Prince Lee Boo on the East Indiaman , and they arrived on 14 July 1784. Prince Lee Boo died of smallpox five. months after arriving in England. 

The painter Arthur William Devis was a passenger on Antelope when she wrecked.

Antelopes compass, which Capt. Henry Wilson had given to one of the local chiefs , was later handed over to a crew member of Mentor. A violent storm in 1832 had wrecked Mentor on Lord North's Island.

Notes, citations, and references
Notes

Citations

References
 
 
 
 

1780 ships
Ships of the British East India Company
Age of Sail ships of England
History of Palau
Shipwrecks in the Pacific Ocean
Maritime incidents in 1783
Age of Sail merchant ships
Merchant ships of the United Kingdom